Nasira Khatoon is a professor, dean of faculties of science and engineering, senior most professor and first acting vice chancellor of University of Karachi. She is current chief editor of Pakistan Journal of Parasitology.

She is the first scientist to identify a parasite, the Accanthocephala (commonly referred to as the "thorn-headed worm") in the catfish ( khagga ), an edible fish found in the Arabian Sea along the Pakistan.

Personal life 
Nasira Khatoon did her BSc from APWA College for Women in 1983. In 1986, She graduated with MSc degree from the department of zoology, Karachi University. In both BSc and MSc, she scored first divisions. Her PhD in Parasitology from KU's department of zoology was completed in 1994. She specialized in the fields of clinical and veterinary Parasitology and Pathology, and Fish Pathology.

Career 
Khatoon started her career as a museum assistant in Karachi University, on June 6, 1987. She remained in position till March 1, 1988. On April 30, 1989, she joined Zoology department as a cooperative teacher, and remained in the position till her appointment as an ad-hoc lecturer by department, in March 1990. And in March 1994, she became assistant professor. She went on to become associate professor and professor in January 2000 and November 2005 respectively. She became chairperson department of zoology on October 25, 2019, till November 3, 2020.

In February 2022, she became first acting VC of University of Karachi, after being notified by the universities and boards department of the Sindh. She was first lady to hold office of VC Karachi University, in last 71 years. Her tenure ended on July 28, 2022.

As of 2022, she has supervised 7 PhDs and 3 MPhils. She has co-written 35 books and published 190 research papers in international and national journals. She is also current chief editor of Pakistan Journal of Parasitology.

References 

Living people
Pakistani women academics
Academic staff of the University of Karachi
Year of birth missing (living people)